Hassan Hosni Tawfik (7 November 1911 – 25 November 2005) was an Egyptian épée and foil fencer. He competed at the 1936, 1948 and 1952 Summer Olympics.

References

External links
 

1911 births
2005 deaths
Egyptian male foil fencers
Olympic fencers of Egypt
Fencers at the 1936 Summer Olympics
Fencers at the 1948 Summer Olympics
Fencers at the 1952 Summer Olympics
Egyptian male épée fencers